Nagaura Station (長浦駅) is the name of two train stations in Japan:

 Nagaura Station (Aichi)
 Nagaura Station (Chiba)